Gianni De Michelis (26 November 1940 – 11 May 2019) was an Italian politician, prominent member of the Italian Socialist Party (PSI), who served as minister in many Italian governments in the 1980s and early 1990s.

Biography
De Michelis was born in Venice in 1940. He graduated in 1963 in Industrial Chemistry at the University of Padua and began his academic career, first as an assistant and then as a lecturer, becoming an associate professor of Chemistry in 1980 at the Ca' Foscari University of Venice. After a long leave due to political and institutional commitments, he returned to university teaching from 1994 to 1999.

He started his political career with the Italian Socialist Party, where he was elected to the municipal council of Venice. He got elected for the first time to the Italian Parliament in 1976 and was elected again in 1979, 1983, 1987, 1992 and 2006. He was Minister of State Holdings from 1980 to 1983. He then became Minister of Work in 1986 (with Bettino Craxi as President of the Council). His career however reached the top with his nomination to the Vice-Presidency of the Council in 1988-1989. He became Minister for Foreign Affairs in 1989 and kept that post until 1992.

Between 1993 and 2001, during the so-called "judicial storm of Mani Pulite", was accused of corruption along with many of the socialists MPs and regional administrators. Within more than 35 different trails, apart from the numerous favorable verdicts, he has been convicted of corruption and was sentenced to 1 year and 6 months (negotiated) in Venice for highways bribes in Veneto and to 6 months for illegal financing (Enimont bribe, also negotiated).

In 1996, De Michelis founded a political movement named the Socialist Party with Ugo Intini and other former Italian Socialist Party (PSI) members, which later was joined by the Socialist League of Claudio Martelli and Bobo Craxi to form the New PSI in 2001. He was elected secretary of the new party at the first congress.

De Michelis was elected at the 2004 European elections as a Member of the European Parliament (MEP) for Southern Italy with the NPSI, and was therefore a Non-Inscrit in the European Parliament whilst awaiting the acceptance of his party's request of membership in the Socialist Group. He sat in the Committee on Industry, Research and Energy, and was a substitute for the Committee on Legal Affairs, a member of the Delegation for relations with the People's Republic of China and a substitute for the Delegation to the Euro-Mediterranean Parliamentary Assembly.

His leadership however had been contested in the congress of October 2005 where the son of Bettino Craxi, Bobo Craxi claimed to have been declared secretary after De Michelis had left the hall declaring the Congress void. This led Bobo Craxi to open a judicial case. The judge, on the second verdicts, gave unquestionably confirmed the right to use the symbol and the secretary to Gianni De Michelis.

At the 2006 Italian general election he was elected MP for the Italian parliament but gave his seat to Lucio Barani since he decided to stay in the European Parliament. In October 2007, De Michelis joined the newly formed Socialist Party, made up of the diaspora of the historical PSI. At this time, De Michelis along with fellow former NPSI MEP Alessandro Battilocchio were admitted into the parliamentary group of the Party of European Socialists.

De Michelis died in Venice on 11 May 2019 at the age of 78.

Personal life
De Michelis was a great lover of dance and discos: in 1988, he wrote a book entitled "Dove Andiamo a Ballare Questa Sera?" in which he reviewed 250 Italian dance night clubs.

Electoral history

Writings

References

External links
 
 

1940 births
2019 deaths
Politicians of Veneto
Politicians from Venice
Deputy Prime Ministers of Italy
Foreign ministers of Italy
Italian Socialist Party politicians
Italian Methodists
Italian Christian socialists
New Italian Socialist Party MEPs
MEPs for Italy 2004–2009
Socialist Party (Italy, 1996) politicians
New Italian Socialist Party politicians
Methodist socialists
Deaths from Parkinson's disease
Neurological disease deaths in Veneto
Italian politicians convicted of crimes
Deputies of Legislature VII of Italy
Deputies of Legislature VIII of Italy
Deputies of Legislature IX of Italy
Deputies of Legislature X of Italy
Deputies of Legislature XI of Italy
Italian Freemasons